Deadman Creek is the mainstream creek that becomes the Owens River where Big Springs enters the Deadman Creek channel, "two miles east of the [CalTrans]  US395 Crestview maintenance station", near Deadman Summit.  The Sierra Crest demarcates the creek's drainage from the drainage of the Middle Fork San Joaquin River on the west.

See also
List of rivers of California

References

Rivers of Mono County, California
Rivers of Northern California
Wild and Scenic Rivers of the United States